The 1981 UCI Track Cycling World Championships were the World Championship for track cycling. They took place in Brno, Czechoslovakia in 1981. Fourteen events were contested, 12 for men (5 for professionals, 7 for amateurs) and 2 for women.

Medal summary

Medal table

Competitors

The Netherlands

The next riders were selected by the KNWU after the Dutch national championships and were published on 10 August 1981.

Australia
Men's professional
Danny Clark - men's keirin

Belgium
Women
Claudine Vierstraete - women's sprint   (eliminated Galina Tsareva in earlier round)
Gerda Sierens - women's individual pursuit

Canada
Men's amateurs
? - men's team pursuit
? - men's team pursuit
? - men's team pursuit
? - men's team pursuit

Denmark
Men's professional
Oersted - individual pursuit

Czech Republic
Women
? - women's sprint (won her qualification heat)
Hana Hotova - women's sprint (finished 2nd in qualification heat)

East Germany
Men's amateur
Detlaf Macha - amateur individual pursuit  (won qualification in 4:46.71, won final in 4:47.78)

France
Men's amateur
Cahard - sprint (felt and broke two ribs)
Men's professional
Patrick Clerc - keirin (felt in 1st round repaches and was taken away with a brancard)

West Germany
Women
Claudia Lommatzsch - women's sprint  (qualified 1st round, qualified 2nd round, won 3rd round from Sue Novarra (2-0), quarter final.., won bronze final from Natalya Kroetsjeniskaja after 3 races)

Men's amateur
Rainer Podlesch - motor-paced  (qualified for final after winning qualification heat)
Schutz - motor-paced

Men's professional
 Schultz - motor-paced

Italy
Men's amateur
Fusarpoli - motor-paced (qualified for final after winning qualification heat)
Men's professional
Borgognoni - individual pursuit
Morandi - individual pursuit
Vicino - motor-paced
Women
Rosella Gabiati - women's sprint (won 1st round from Sue Novarra)

Lebanon
Men's amateur
Ahmed Abdussal Gariani - sprint (lost from Rainier Valkenburg in 1st round)

Poland
Men's amateur
Jan Jankiewicz - individual pursuit (lost bronze medal race from Maurizio Bidinost (5:52.01 vs 4:49.40))
 Platek - sprint (won 2nd round repaches from Rainier Valkenburg)
 Konkoleweski - tandem (lost from the Netherlands in first round, won the repechages)
 ? - tandem (lost from the Netherlands in first round, won the repechages)

Brazil
? - men's amateur individual pursuit

Soviet Union
Women's
Galina Tsareva - women's sprint (eliminated by Claudine Vierstraete)
Natalya Kroetsjeniskaja - women's sprint (lost bronze final from Claudia Lommatzsch after 3 races)
Olga Kibardina - women's individual pursuit
Men's amateur
 Goelasjvili - sprint (won 2nd round from Rainier Valkenburg)

Switzerland
Men's amateur
 Max Hurzeler - motor-paced 
 Isler - sprint (lost from Rainier Valkenburg in 1st round)
Men's professional
Urs Freuler - keirin

United States
Women
Conny Paravaskin - sprint (finished 3rd in her qualification heat)
Sheila Young - sprint  (qualified 1st round, won 2nd round from Erica Oomen, qualified 3rd round, result quarter final?)
Sue Novarra - sprint (lost 1st round from Rosella Gabiati, lost 2nd round, won 2nd round repechages from Erica Oomen, lost 3rd round from Lommatzsch (0-2))

Men's professional
Eric Heiden - individual pursuit (finished 19th and last)

See also
 1981 UCI Road World Championships

References

Uci Track Cycling World Championships, 1981
Track cycling
UCI Track Cycling World Championships by year
International cycle races hosted by Czechoslovakia
Sport in Brno
August 1981 sports events in Europe
September 1981 sports events in Europe